Soft Cost is a construction industry term but more specifically a contractor accounting term for an expense item that is not considered direct construction cost. Soft costs include architectural, engineering, financing, and legal fees, and other pre- and post-construction expenses. The term has been replaced in most contractor accrual accounting with the term General & Administrative abbreviated G&A.

Overview
For a contractor, soft costs are essentially construction costs incurred that are not labor and materials. Delay in Start Up insurance coverage and soft costs are not the same. Some soft costs may be incurred in the repair of a covered loss before the anticipated completion date is reached. These can be architect fees or engineering fees incurred to repair loss or damage to the insured property. Only those indirect costs that are above what would have been incurred up to the anticipated completion date but continue after such date due to the insured delay are soft costs that are covered by delay in completion or delay in start up coverage. Soft cost is a contractor accounting term for their expenses that are not associated with a particular construction task. Their construction trailer, water delivery, book keepers, etc. are all soft costs that continue on after the original anticipated completion date is reached, if the project is delayed. Only if the delay was caused by an insured loss would the insurance pick these expenses up, and only if the policy includes delay in start up coverage. Any repair costs which are not labor or materials and are indemnified to complete the repair of property loss should not be reported under delay in completion and there is no delay in completion until the anticipated date of completion is reached, and the project is not finished.  Not all indirect costs are time related expenses that continue after the original date of completion. Those soft costs (indirect costs) which are continuing fixed expenses that continue because the project is delayed by an insured loss are soft costs that should be included with the delay in start up values. A soft cost to a contractor, such as his administration costs, can be a hard cost to the owner because what the contractor invoices the owner is the owner's direct cost. If the owner employs engineers to overlook construction as the project is executed, this will be a continuing expense during repair if the repair is done after the original completion date and would be reported in the delay in completion values. If the engineer cost was a one time charge for a design, he may need to be consulted in order for the loss to be repaired. This expense does not occur because of a delay, but is incurred to repair property damage and hence should be included in the construction costs if the intention is for that expense to be covered in the indemnification depending on policy wording. If the project is insured to the extent of the reported values, and that value was left out to compute the premium, the company may decline that cost in the indemnification.

Soft costs differ from hard costs in both labor and materials; they are generally not considered to be exclusively related to physical construction. Rather, they are commonly perceived to entail non-construction costs such as taxes, marketing expenses, interest payments, and finance charges. The soft costs endorsement provided in the Builders’ Risk section of the AAIS Inland Marine Guide lists 10 types of soft costs: advertising, design fees, professional fees, financing, lease administration, real estate taxes, general administration, lease expenses, permit fees, and insurance premiums.

In recent years, a solution to the problem has emerged in the form of Delay in Opening coverage which can be provided in Builder's Risk Insurance. This coverage can provide indemnification for these indirect costs that may continue after the original completion date. Other soft costs that can be repeated in the repair of the property should be reported with the property values. A Draw Back expense proforma shows which soft costs are one time charges and which are continuing expenses throughout the project term. Engineer design fee is a one time charge that can be incurred again in a repair whereas engineer oversight of quality persists through the term and after.
Unfortunately, these contractor accounting terms are being used when the owner is insured and many have erroneously equated hard costs with property and soft costs with business interruption which is called Delay in Opening coverage being added to some builder's risk policies. With its popularity increasing in recent years, some insurers automatically include soft costs coverage, which can be activated by designating the limit on policy declarations. However, these modifications to builder's risk insurance will not cover the efficiency of business owners or managers. Soft costs can also refer to the failure of implementing a strategy in a timely manner, or the opportunity cost of delaying a solution to a problem for discussion or consideration. For this reason, it is important to understand that soft costs can refer to unforeseen construction costs (lost screws, damaged equipment), physical labor (task takes longer than expected, losing a key team member), or time wasted on strategy implementation (taking too long to decide a course of action).

References 

Cost engineering